La Casa del recuerdo (The House of Memory) is a 1940 Argentine film by Luis Saslavsky.

References

External links
 

1940 films
1940s Spanish-language films
Argentine black-and-white films
Argentine drama films
1940 drama films
1940s Argentine films